Go Airlines may refer to:
Go First, Indian airline
Go! (airline), defunct airline which operated inter-island flights in Hawaii
Go (airline), defunct British low-cost airline